"Make Me Love You"  is a song recorded by South Korean singer Kim Tae-yeon. It was released as a single on April 5, 2017, by SM Entertainment. The song's lyrics were penned by Jo Yun-kyung while its music was composed by Matthew Tishler, Felicia Barton and Aaron Benward. The song is the title track of the Deluxe edition of Taeyeon's first studio album, My Voice, which was released on the same day.

Background and release 
On April 5, 2017, SM Entertainment released the deluxe edition of Taeyeon's first album My Voice, along with a music video for the title song "Make Me Love You". The song is described as a R&B pop song that would warm up the spring season with her charming tone and soulful vocals.
The song was included on the setlist of Taeyeon's first Asia tours concert "Persona", taking place in Seoul (South Korea), Taipei (Taiwan), Bangkok (Thailand) and Hong Kong in May and June 2017.

Reception
"Make Me Love You" debuted at number 4 on South Korea's Gaon Digital Chart for the chart issue dated April 2–8, 2017. It additionally peaked at number 11 on the Billboard World Digital Songs chart.

Personnel 
Credits are adapted from the CD booklet of My Voice (Deluxe edition).

 Korean lyrics by Jo Yun-kyung 
 Composed by Matthew Tishler, Felicia Barton and Aaron Benward
 Arranged by Matthew Tishler, Felicia Barton and Aaron Benward
 Vocal directed by G-High
 Pro Tools operating by G-High
 Background vocals by Taeyeon, Felicia Barton
 Recorded by Jung Eun Kyung at Ingrid Studio
 Mixed by Jung Eui Suk
 Mastered by Tom Coyne at Sterling Sound

Charts

Weekly charts

Monthly charts

Sales

Release history

References 

2017 singles
2017 songs
SM Entertainment singles
Korean-language songs
Taeyeon songs
Songs written by Felicia Barton
Songs written by Matthew Tishler
Songs written by Aaron Benward